Several United States vice presidents have borne a coat of arms; largely through inheritance, assumption, or grants from foreign heraldic authorities. The vice president of the United States, as a position, uses the Seal of the Vice President of the United States as a coat of arms, but this is a coat of arms of office, not a personal coat of arms.

Arms of vice presidents

References

Further reading
 Bailey, Banks & Biddle Company (Philadelphia, Pa.). Alphabetical List of Coat Armour As Borne by Americans of the Colonial Period, and by Late Settlers in the United States and the Dominion of Canada, of Authenticated Armiger Ancestry: The Arms on Display, and Catalogued Herein, Represent Those so Far Completed in a Collection Which, We Anticipate, Will Eventually Total in Excess of Five Thousand Coats of Arms. Philadelphia: Bailey, Banks & Biddle Co, 1910.  
 Crozier, William Armstrong. Crozier's General Armory; A Registry of American Families Entitled to Coat Armor. Baltimore: Genealogical Pub. Co, 1966. 
 Matthews, John. Matthews' American Armoury and Blue Book. New York: Crest Pub. Co, 1962. 
 Neff, Elizabeth Clifford. Heraldry. Cleveland, Ohio: Korner & Wood Co, 1910. 
 Valcourt-Vermont, E. de. America Heraldica: A Compilation of Coats of Arms, Crests and Mottoes of Prominent American Families Settled in This Country Before 1800. New York, N.Y.: Heraldic Pub. Co, 1965. 
 Zieber, Eugene. Rules for the Proper Usage of Heraldry in the United States. Philadelphia: Department of heraldry of the Bailey, Banks & Biddle company, 1890. 
 Zieber, Eugene. Heraldry in America. Philadelphia : Department of Heraldry of the Bailey, Banks & Biddle Co., 1895. Reprint: Zieber, Eugene. Heraldry in America: A Guide with 1000 Illustrations. Mineola, N.Y.: Dover Publications, 2006.

External links

 American Heraldry Society
 The Institute of Heraldry, Office of the Administrative Assistant to the Secretary of the Army

Vice Presidents
United States
Coats of arms